Market Park may refer to:

 Handlan's Park, St. Louis, Missouri
 Market Park, Crieff, Scotland,  home of the Crieff Highland Games
 Washington Market Park, lower Manhattan, New York
 Victor Steinbrueck Park, Downtown Seattle, Washington, originally known as Market Park